wiidope is a production group of three musicians, composers and engineers that assembled in 2009 while attending Berklee College of Music for postgraduate studies. Members are Carl Seanté (McGrier II), Kofi Owusu-Ofori and Kyuwon "Q" Kim. Their most notable works include YouTube/MTV personality Todrick Hall, RuPaul, Brandy, Tamar Braxton, Korean Boy-band SHINee and their work on the Grammy Award winning album, The Mosaic Project, with jazz drummer, composer and vocalist Terri Lyne Carrington.


Notable works

Notable acts and credits
 Brandy
 Chester Gregory
 Cynthia Erivo
 Esperanza Spalding
 IM5
 Jadagrace
 Jade Novah
 Jeeve Ducornet
 Jordin Sparks
 Joseph Gordon-Levitt
 Keala Settle
 Nicole Scherzinger
 Nona Hendryx
 Prince
 Raney Shockne
 Raven Symone
 RuPaul
 Shea Rose
 SHINee
 Shoshana Bean
 Tamar Braxton
 Terri Lyne Carrington
 Todrick Hall
 Vonzell Solomon
 WeeklyChris

Mentors
 Susan Rogers
 Prince Charles Alexander
 David Jeong
 Kerry Gordy

References

Musical groups from Boston